Niwica  (German Zibelle) is a village in the administrative district of Gmina Trzebiel, within Żary County, Lubusz Voivodeship, in western Poland, close to the German border.
German scientist Walther Nernst died in Zibelle in 1941.

References

Villages in Żary County